Glyphidocera septentrionella is a moth of the family Autostichidae. It is known from North America, including British Columbia, California, Illinois, New York, Oklahoma, Pennsylvania, South Carolina and Texas.

The wingspan is 18–19 mm. The antennae are yellowish fuscous and the face and head are yellowish. The thorax and forewings are yellowish fuscous, evenly sprinkled with black scales. There is a very faint blackish round spot on the basal part of the cell and a similar one somewhat more pronounced on the middle of the cell and a double one at the end of the cell. The hindwings are yellowish fuscous.

References

External links
Bug Guide

Moths described in 1904
Glyphidocerinae